Bretzenheim was a minor principality in pre-Napoleonic Germany. It was created in 1790 for Prince Charles Augustus (1769-1823) of the line of Wittelsbach-Bretzenheim, son of Charles Theodore, Elector of Bavaria and Palatinate. Its territory in central Germany was mediatised to Hesse-Darmstadt in 1803, and its territory north of Lake Constance was mediatised to Austria in 1804. Before 1789-1790 it was an Imperial Lordship and it had some important rulers, including Ambrosius Franz, Count of Virmont. In 1772 the Elector of Palatinate bought the Lordship (Imperial County 1774 ) for his son.

Prince of Bretzenheim
 Charles Augustus (1790–1804)

1790 establishments in the Holy Roman Empire
1804 disestablishments in the Holy Roman Empire
States and territories established in 1790
Lists of princes
Counties of the Holy Roman Empire
Former monarchies of Europe